The 1927–28 North Carolina Tar Heels men's basketball team represented the University of North Carolina during the 1927–28 NCAA men's basketball season in the United States. The team finished the season with a 17–2 record.

References

 North Carolina Tar Heels men's basketball seasons
North Carolina
North Carolina Tar Heels Men's Basketball Team
North Carolina Tar Heels Men's Basketball Team